Poke is a surname. Notable people with the surname include:

 Bob Poke (1906–1989), Australian politician
 Greville Poke (1912–2000), British arts administrator
 James Poke (born 1963), English musician
 Michael Poke (born 1985), English footballer